Orceolina kerguelensis is a lichen in the family Trapeliaceae. It is the type species of the genus Orceolina.

Ecology
Its predators include the land snail Notodiscus hookeri.

References

Baeomycetales
Lichen species
Lichens described in 1875
Taxa named by Edward Tuckerman